Smith Mountain Cooperative Wildlife Management Area is a  Wildlife Management Area (WMA) in Bedford and Pittsylvania counties, Virginia. Located on the shores of Smith Mountain Lake, the WMA is owned by Appalachian Power and cooperatively managed by the Virginia Department of Game and Inland Fisheries and the Virginia Outdoors Foundation through a conservation easement that permits public access.

History
The area was established in January 2009 when a conservation easement was donated by Appalachian Power to the Virginia Department of Game and Inland Fisheries and the Virginia Outdoors Foundation. The land was first acquired by Appalachian Power in the 1950s during the construction of the Smith Mountain Dam hydroelectric project.

Description
The majority of Smith Mountain Cooperative WMA is located in Pittsylvania County, with the remainder in Bedford County. It is adjacent to Bourassa State Forest.

Game animals found within the area include deer, bear, turkey, squirrels, and raccoons. Several rare species and a rare type of natural community are also found within the WMA.

Smith Mountain Cooperative WMA is open to the public for hunting, trapping, fishing, hiking, horseback riding, and primitive camping. Access for persons 17 years of age or older requires a valid hunting or fishing permit, or a WMA access permit.

See also
 List of Virginia Wildlife Management Areas

References

External links
Virginia Department of Game and Inland Fisheries: Smith Mountain Cooperative Wildlife Management Area

Wildlife management areas of Virginia
Protected areas of Bedford County, Virginia
Protected areas of Pittsylvania County, Virginia
Protected areas established in 2009
2009 establishments in Virginia